is a series of 2.5D stage plays directed by Worry Kinoshita and written by Norihito Nakayashiki, based on the manga Haikyu!! by Haruichi Furudate. Since its debut in 2015, the series has amassed over 320,000 viewers during its run, spanning over a total of ten stage plays.

Background and creation

The first stage play was announced in Weekly Shonen Jump in March 2015, with Worry Kinoshita directing, Norihito Nakayashiki writing the script, and Shunsuke Wada in charge of music direction. The play was described as a "hyper projection play" using projection allowing for manga-styled effects and a revolving stage.

Kinoshita had experience from directing productions using projection mapping, having directed a stage project for Tokyo Performance Doll in 2013. However, at the time, prior to his work on Engeki Haikyu!!, he had never seen 2.5D musicals. After reading the manga, he decided to stage the plays on "human drama" with "strong performance elements", as he had noticed that there were no dynamic "moves" or "magical attacks" in the series as there were in other sports manga. Nakayashiki, on the other hand, was a fan of Haikyu!!, and prepared a script from select dialogue from the original manga with no stage directions. Together, Kinoshita focused on staging the scenes while Nakayashiki focused on the dialogue between the characters. After storyboarding the scenes with stage directions, Kinoshita worked with the choreographer and several dancers before implementing the actors. He instructed the actors to resemble the characters from Haikyu!! as much as possible, but did not give them specific instructions beyond that.

Production history

2015–2018

The cast for Karasuno and Aoba Johsai was revealed in July 2015 in Weekly Shonen Jump. The play premiered on November 14, 2015, at the AiiA 2.5 Theater Tokyo, later running shows in Osaka and Miyagi until December 2015. The play covers the introduction of the Karasuno High School volleyball team and their practice match with Aoba Johsai. It was released on DVD on March 16, 2016. The popularity of the play led to a second run with minor cast changes, which was retitled  and ran from April 8, 2016, to May 8, 2016.

The second stage play, ran from October 28, 2016, to December 4, 2016, which focuses on Karasuno's practice match with Nekoma, and interhigh qualifier matches against Tokonami and Date Tech. It was released on DVD on April 19, 2017.

The third stage play, takes place during Karasuno's match against Aoba Johsai during the inter-high. The play ran from March 24, 2017, to May 7, 2017, in Tokyo, Miyagi, Osaka, and Fukuoka. It was released on DVD and Blu-ray on September 13, 2017.

The fourth stage play, ran from September 8, 2017, to October 29, 2017, focusing on the summer training camp with Karasuno, Nekoma, and Fukurodani. The play introduced new cast members for Fukurodani, Kiyoko, Yachi, Saeko, and Akiteru. It was released on DVD and Blu-ray on March 14, 2018.

The fifth stage play, ran from April 28, 2018, to June 17, 2018, focusing on Hinata and Kageyama developing a new technique and introducing new cast members for Jōzenji and Wakutani Minami. It was released on DVD and Blu-ray on October 17, 2018.

The sixth stage play, which focuses on Karasuno's match against Aoba Johsai and Shiratorizawa at the spring prefectural finals tournament, ran from October 20, 2018, to December 16, 2018. The production team also announced that all actors for Karasuno will leave production after the play. It was released on DVD and Blu-ray on April 17, 2019.

2019–present

The seventh stage play, ran from April 4, 2019, to May 6, 2019, focusing on the match between Nekoma and Fukurodani with new cast members for Nohebi. It was released on DVD and Blu-ray on October 16, 2019.

The eighth stage play, ran from November 1, 2019, to December 15, 2019, starring an all new cast for Karasuno after the departure of the previous cast. New cast members for Sakusa, Hoshiumi, Atsumu, and Kanoka were also introduced, alongside the reprisal of selected roles from Aoba Johsai, Shiratorizawa, and Date Tech.

The ninth stage play, was announced to run from March 21, 2020, to May 6, 2020, focusing on the match between Karasuno and Inarizaki at the Spring High. This play introduced new cast members for Inarizaki, Shimada and Saeko, and the reprisal of selected roles from Aoba Johsai, Shiratorizawa, and Date Tech as pre-recorded video appearances. However, the play only ran from March 21 to March 22, for four performances, due to the COVID-19 pandemic.

The tenth stage play,  was announced to run from October 31, 2020, to December 13, 2020, focusing on the Spring High match between Karasuno and Nekoma. This play introduced new cast members for Ikkei Ukai and Nekomata. Although the November 15, 2020, performances were cancelled, the production successfully ran to its intended end date.

The eleventh and final stage play, A View From the Top 2 (頂の景色・２, Itadaki no Keshiki Ni) was announced to run from March 20, 2021, to May 9, 2021, focusing on the Spring High match between Karasuno and Kamomedai along with the timeskip match between the MSBY Black Jackal and Schweiden Adlers. This play introduced new cast members for Kamomedai, Tenma Udai, Wakatsu Kiryū, and the reprisal of selected roles from Aoba Johsai, Nekoma, Date Tech, Shiratorizawa, and Inarizaki as both in-person and as pre-recorded video appearances. Due to a declared state of emergency in Tokyo and two production members testing positive for COVID-19, however, the production was only able to run until April 24, 2021, as the finale performance and its considered no-audience alternative were both cancelled.

Principal cast and characters

Karasuno High School

Reception

The stage plays have amassed a cumulative total of 320,000 attendees from 2015 to 2019. It was cited as one of the most popular 2.5D stage plays in 2018 along with Musical: The Prince of Tennis and Touken Ranbu; it is partially credited for the public's growing interest in 2.5D stage plays. Kenta Suga was made the ambassador of Japan 2.5-Dimensional Musical Association in 2018 partially for his work on the series.

The DVD release for A View From the Top, sold 8,660 copies on its first week, debuting at #2 on the Oricon Weekly DVD Chart. The DVD release for Karasuno, Revival!, sold 10,020 copies on its first week, debuting at #3 on the Oricon Weekly DVD Chart. The DVD release for The Giant of Beginnings sold 4,247 copies on its first week, debuting at #2 on the Oricon Weekly DVD Chart. The DVD release for The Strongest Team sold 4,247 copies on its first week, debuting at #2 on the Oricon Weekly DVD Chart.

Sakura Eries of The Fandom Post called the series a "high-level production" with a cast that "displays an array of talent, ranging from acting to acrobatics to rap", noting that the plays used "clever choreography" and "simple effects."

Notes

References

External links
 

2015 plays
2016 plays
2017 plays
2018 plays
2019 plays
2.5D musicals
Haikyu!!
Musicals based on anime and manga